Apocalypse Man is an American television program that premiered on January 6, 2010 on History. Hosted by U.S. Marine and martial-artist Rudy Reyes, the show is based on how to survive the aftermath of the end of the world.

Format
Reyes demonstrates various techniques for surviving interesting post-apocalyptic scenarios. In the pilot, Reyes uses a bike pump to siphon diesel fuel to power a hospital's generator, creates a makeshift grappling hook to scale over a part-way raised bridge, demonstrates how to create fire with a battery and steel wool, and shows the proper technique to break down a door in a breaching siege. The pilot was filmed in Detroit.

References 

History (American TV channel) original programming
Works about survival skills

2010 American television series debuts